Ordeal may refer to:

 Trial by ordeal, a religious judicial practice to determine "the will of God"

Books
 Ordeal (autobiography), a 1980 autobiography of Linda Lovelace
 Ordeal (trilogy), 1918–1941 novel trilogy by Aleksey Nikolayevich Tolstoy
 Ordeal, the American title of What Happened to the Corbetts, a 1939 novel by Nevil Shute

Film and television
 The Ordeal (film), a 1922 American silent drama
 "Ordeal" (UFO), a 1971 episode of the TV series UFO
 Ordeal, a 1973 American television film for American Broadcasting Company
 Calvaire (film), also known as The Ordeal, a 2004 psychological horror film
"The Ordeal", an episode of Doctor Who, see The Daleks

Other uses
 Ordeal (album), by Skepticism
 Ordeal (horse) (born 1957), New Zealand Standardbred racemare
 Ordeal (level of OA membership), the first degree of membership in the Order of the Arrow, an organization within the Boy Scouts of America

See also
 Erythrophleum suaveolens or ordeal tree, named for its use in a trial by ordeal